John E. Hurley (November 3, 1906 – September 22, 1992) was an American politician who served as a Massachusetts State Representative, and the Treasurer and Receiver-General of Massachusetts.

Early life and education
Hurley was born on  Buttonwood Street in the Boston neighborhood of Dorchester.  Hurley attended St. Margaret's Grammar School in Boston, he was a 1926 graduate of Boston College High School, and a 1930 graduate of Boston College.

Family
Hurley married Margaret M. Lee of Dorchester, Massachusetts.  The couple had two children: a daughter, Janice L. Hurley, and a son, John E. Hurley, Jr.

Political career

Massachusetts House of Representatives
After his graduation from Boston College in 1930, Hurley ran for the Massachusetts House of Representatives.  At the age of 21, Hurley was elected to represent Boston's Ward 16 in the legislature, serving from 1931 to 1935.

Executive Secretary to Massachusetts Attorney General Paul Dever
When in 1934 fellow representative Paul Dever was elected Massachusetts Attorney General, Hurley became his executive secretary.

Treasurer of Massachusetts
Hurley was elected Massachusetts Treasurer in 1944 and he served from 1945 to 1947.

Hurley was again elected Treasurer in the 1948 election, and served from 1949 until his resignation in 1952.

In 1952 Hurley had been running for reelection, but Governor Dever appointed Hurley clerk of the Boston Municipal Court. Hurley resigned as State Treasurer and Governor Dever then appointed Foster Furcolo to the office.  Hurley served as clerk of the Boston Municipal Court until he retired in 1976.

Death and burial
After a brief illness Hurley died in Milton Hospital, Milton, Massachusetts  and was interred in Mount Benedict Cemetery, West Roxbury, Massachusetts.

See also
 1931–1932 Massachusetts legislature
 1933–1934 Massachusetts legislature

References

State treasurers of Massachusetts
Members of the Massachusetts House of Representatives
Boston College alumni
1906 births
1992 deaths
20th-century American politicians